Bahman Farmanara (born 23 January 1942) is an Iranian film director, screenwriter, and film producer.
Bahman Farmanara is the second son in a family of four brothers and one sister. The family business was Textile and he was the only son who did not join the business and went off to the United Kingdom and later on to the United States to study acting and directing. He graduated from the University of Southern California with a BA in Cinema in 1966. After returning to Iran and doing military service, he joined the National Iranian Radio and Television.

Works
He produced some major films, including Abbas Kiarostami's first feature, The Report (1977), Bahram Bayzai's The Crow (1977), Khosrow Haritash's Divine One (1976), Mohammad-Reza Aslani's Wind and Chess (1976) and Valerio Zurlini's The Desert of the Tartars (1977 co-production with Italy and France).

Farmanara moved to France and then to Canada in 1980, establishing a distribution company and a film festival for children and young adults in Vancouver. He returned to Iran in the mid-1980s.  He made and starred in Fragrance of Jasmine in 2000, which won several prizes from the International Fajr Film Festival, including The Best Film and The Best Director awards.

Politics
On May 10, 2013, Farmanara signed up to run for the office of President of the Islamic Republic of Iran.

Selected filmography
Director
 The House of Qamar Khanoom, 1972
 Prince Ehtedjab, 1974
 The Tall Shadows of the Wind, 1978
 Smell of Camphor, Scent of Jasmine, 2000
 A House Built on Water, 2001
 A Little Kiss, 2005 (A Teensy Kiss would be a better translation of the Persian title Yek Bus-e Ku'chu'lu)
 The Familiar Soil, 2008
I Want to Dance, 2014
Tale of The Sea, 2018
Producer
 The Desert of The Tartars by Valerio Zurlini, 1976
 The Divine One (Malakout) by Khosrow Haritash, 1976
 The Chess Game of the Wind  (Shatranj Baad) by M.R. Aslani, 1976
 The Crow (Kalagh) by Bahram Beyzaii, 1977
 The Report (Gozaresh) by Abbas Kiarostami, 1977
 The Night Never Ends (Dar Emtedad Shab) by Parviz Sayad, 1978
 Tall Shadows Of The wind (Saye Haye Bolnd-e Baad), 1978
 Leolo by Jean Claude Lauzon, 1990
 A House Built on Water (Khane'i Rooye Aab), 2002
Writer
 Prince Ehtedjab, co-writer with Houshang Golshiri Based on Golshiri's Novel by The Same Name, 1974
 Tall Shadows of the Wind, co-writer with Houshang Golshiri, based on his short story "The First Innocent", 1979
 Smell of Camphor, Fragrance of Jasmine Original Script, 2000
 A House Built on Water Original Script, 2002
 A Little Kiss, 2005
 A Passage to Darkness Original script
Documentary films
 Norouz va Khaviar, 1969
 Tehran-e Now va Kohneh, 1970
Television
 From 1968 to 1971 Over 150 Weekly Programs on Current Cinema as Producer and Anchor
Actor
Smell of Camphor, Scent of Jasmine, 2000
No Choice, 2020

Awards

PRINCE EHTEJAB
Grand Prix For Best Film In 3rd  Tehran International Film Festival 1976.

SMELL OF CAMPHOR, FRAGRANCE OF JASMINE
8 Awards at Fajr International Film Festival, Including Best Film, Best Director, Best Screenplay, Best Cinematography, Best Music, Best Supporting Actress Best Art Direction, Best Make Up, Special Jury Prize For Best Film Montreal International Film Festival 2000. Golden Tulip Grand Prix As  Best Film at  Istanbul International Film Festival 2001.A HOUSE BUILT ON WATERWinner of 5 Awards at Fajr International Film Festival, Including Best Film,Best Actor, Best Supporting Actor, Best Supporting Actress, and Best Art Direction.

 See also 
List of Iranian films of the 2000s
Ahmad Pejman
Houshang Golshiri

References

https://web.archive.org/web/20070820222144/http://www.bahmanfarmanara.com/home.htm
https://web.archive.org/web/20081004043436/http://www.movie-vault.com/reviews/thsnqidyXYelHduC
http://www.imdb.com/name/nm0267715/

External links

 
 
 His interview on May 3, 2001 by NPR's "Fresh Air" with Terry Gross
 New Yorker Films Presents: Smell of Camphor, Fragrance of Jasmine, Official Selection 2000, New York Film Festival, PDF. Contains also a reproduction of Hamid Dabashi's Bahman Farmanara: Twice Upon a Time''.
 Bahman Farmanara's Website

Iranian film directors
Iranian film producers
Iranian screenwriters
People from Tehran
1942 births
Living people
Crystal Simorgh for Best Director winners
Producers who won the Best Film Crystal Simorgh